Sapmaz may refer to:

 Sapmaz, Aksaray, village in Aksaray Province, Turkey
 Sapmaz, Kürtün, village in Gümüşhane Province, Turkey